North Adelaide Football Club, nicknamed The Roosters, is an Australian rules football club affiliated with the South Australian National Football League (SANFL) and SANFL Women's League (SANFLW). The club plays its home games at Prospect Oval, located in Prospect, a northern suburb of Adelaide. The club joined the SAFA in 1888 as the Medindie Football Club (nickname Dingoes), changing its name to North Adelaide in 1893. It is the fourth oldest club still in operation in the SANFL after South Adelaide (1877), Port Adelaide (1877) and Norwood (1878). North Adelaide's first premiership was won in 1900 (which finally broke the dominance of the 3 older clubs), and the club has won a total of fourteen senior men's premierships in the SANFL, most recently in 2018.

History

The club was originally formed in 1881 as Medindie by a number of college students from Prince Alfred College and the now defunct Whinham College, including Charles Nitschke who would become known as the founding Father of North Adelaide Football Club. The club's first reported games were in May 1882 against Prince Alfred and St Peters Colleges Second Twenties both on Medindie's home ground.   South Australian Football Hall of Fame and Australian Football Hall of Fame inductee Jack 'Dinny' Reedman and future North Adelaide Premiership Captain began his career at Medindie in 1884.

Medindie was a foundation member in 1885 of the South Australian Junior Football Association, before spending the 1886 and 1887 seasons competing in the Adelaide and Suburban Football Association. 

Joining the SAFA in 1888 as Medindie, on 14 March 1893 the club at a meeting held at Temperance Hall, Tynte Street, North Adelaide unanimously decided to renamed itself North Adelaide. Although several other early clubs used the name of "North Adelaide" prior to 1893, none of them bore ties to the current club.

North Adelaide started playing at Prospect Oval from 1922 with the first game of the season on Monday 8 May 1922 against Glenelg and it has remained their home ground ever since.

The North Adelaide Football Club officially renamed both ends of Prospect Oval in 2012 after the two official Icons of the Club. The northern end around the goals was named the "Ken Farmer End", while the southern end was named the "Barrie Robran End".

North Adelaide competed in the first match played at Football Park (now known as AAMI Stadium) in round 5, 1974. Their opponent was Central District. The match was won by Central District.

The longest serving coach for the club is Michael Nunan – 12 seasons from 1981 to 1992. The Captain's record is held by Ian McKay, captaining the team for 8 years from 1948–1955.

North Adelaide was a foundation member of the SANFL Women's competition in 2017. The Roosters lost two grand finals in the league before eventually claiming their maiden women's premiership in 2020.

Club Icons
The North Adelaide Football Club has named two of their past champions as Icons. They are:

 Ken Farmer – All-time leading SANFL goal kicker with 1,419 from 1929–41. Premiership player in 1930 and 1931. Premiership coach in 1949 and 1952. Since 1981 the leading goalkicker in each SANFL season has been awarded the "Ken Farmer Medal". He kicked 105 goals in 1930 to become the first SA League player to kick 100 goals in a season. He was a prolific goalkicker, kicking 100 goals in a season in 11 consecutive seasons (1930–1940). Farmer also holds the record for the most goals in an SANFL match – 23 against West Torrens at Prospect on 6 July 1940. Farmer scored ten or more goals in thirty-seven matches, and 1,419 goals in total over his career, at an astounding average of 6.3 per match.

 Barrie Robran – Triple Magarey Medallist (1968, 1970, 1973). Premiership player in 1971 and 1972, is North Adelaide's other iconic player, Barrie Robran, played 201 League games for the Roosters and 10 State games, and won 3 Magarey Medals (1968, 1970 and 1973). He was the first SANFL player to be made a "Legend"  in the Australian Football Hall of Fame, and the only "Legend" not to have played VFL or AFL.

Club song
North Adelaide have had many versions of their club song in the past. All versions have contained the same lyrics, but have been changed rhythm wise to keep up with the times. The lyrics and tune, by well known Australian singer/songwriter Johnny Mac, are the only completely original written in the league, as all the other clubs have written lyrics to well known tunes. The most recent version was brought in during the early 2000s, but all versions can still be found on the club song CD.

Current playing list

Club achievements

Club records
Home Ground: Prospect Oval (1922–present)
Previous Home Grounds: Kensington Oval (1888–94), Adelaide Oval (1895–98, 1902–03, 1905–21), Jubilee Oval (1899–1901, 1904)
Record Attendance at Prospect Oval: 19,120 v Port Adelaide in Round 5, 1958
Record Attendance: 56,525 v Glenelg at Adelaide Oval, 1973 SANFL Grand Final
Record Attendance at AAMI Stadium: 50,617 v Glenelg, 1987 SANFL Grand Final
Record Attendance since Adelaide Crows (AFL) formation (1991): 40,355 v Norwood at Adelaide Oval, 2018 SANFL Grand Final
Record Attendance since Port Adelaide (AFL) entry (1997): 40,355 v Norwood at Adelaide Oval, 2018 SANFL Grand Final
Most Games: 378 by Michael Redden (1978–93) plus 11 state games
Most Goals in a Season: 134 by Ken Farmer in 1936
Most Goals for the Club: 1419 by Ken Farmer (1929–41, 224 games)
First player to kick 100 goals in an SANFL season: Ken Farmer (1930 – 105 goals)
Most Years as Coach: 12 by Michael Nunan (1981–92)
Most Premierships as Coach: 2 by P. Lewis (1930, 1931), Ken Farmer (1949, 1952), Mike Patterson (1971, 1972) and Michael Nunan (1987, 1991)
Most Years as Captain: 8 by Ian McKay (1948–55)
Most Premierships as Captain: 2 by John Reedman (1902, 1905), Percy Furler (1930, 1931), Ian McKay (1949, 1952) and Mike Patterson (1971, 1972)
Most Best & Fairest Awards: 7 by Barrie Robran (1967–73)
Highest Score: 34.22 (226) v South Adelaide 6.12 (48) at Adelaide Oval in Round 5, 1972

Premiership sides

2018 Premiership Side

North Adelaide 19.10 (124) defeated Norwood 15.15 (105)
Venue: Adelaide Oval
Attendance: 40,355
Date: 23 September 2018
Umpires: Bowen, Medlin, Harris
Jack Oatey Medallist: Mitch Grigg (Norwood)

Best: Schwarz Allmond Barns Tropiano Woodcock Castree
Goals: 
4 – Barns
3 – Harvey, Woodcock, McInerney 
2 – Hender
1 – Ramsey, Sweet, Wilkie, Young

1991 Premiership Side

North Adelaide 21.22 (148) defeated West Adelaide 11.7 (73)
Venue: Football Park
Attendance: 39,276
Date: 5 October 1991
Umpires: Laurie Argent and Mick	Abbott
Jack Oatey Medallist: Darel Hart

Best: Hart, Perkins, Sanders, Krieg, Redden, Parsons, Sims
Goals: 
7 – Hart
4 – Burton 
2 – Hamilton, Parsons
1 – Atkinson, Clisby, Krieg, Nunan, Perkins, Sanders

1987 Premiership Side

North Adelaide 23.7 (145) defeated Glenelg 9.9 (63)
Venue: Football Park
Attendance: 50,617
Date: 3 October 1987
Umpires: Neville Thorpe, Rick Kinnear
Jack Oatey Medallist: Michael Parsons

Best: 
Goals: 
6 – Parsons
5 – Roberts
4 – Sims
3 – Burton, D. Jarman 
2 – A. Jarman

1972 Premiership Side

North Adelaide 19.14 (128) defeated Port Adelaide 10.12 (72)
Venue: Adelaide Oval
Attendance: 55,709
Date: 30 September 1972
Umpires: 

Best: 
Goals: 
6 – Sachse
3 – Hearl
2 – Marsh, R. Robran, von Bertouch
1 – Phillips, Plummer, Rebbeck, B. Robran, Webb

1971 Premiership Side

North Adelaide 10.19 (79) defeated Port Adelaide 9.5 (59)
Venue: Adelaide Oval
Attendance: 52,228
Date: 25 September 1971
Umpires: 

Best: 
Goals: 
4 – Rebbeck
3 – Webb
2 – Sachse
1 – Collins

1960 Premiership Side

North Adelaide 14.11 (95) defeated Norwood 13.12 (90)
Venue: Adelaide Oval
Attendance: 54,162
Date: 1 October 1960
Umpire: 

Best: Potts, Gilbourne, Hammond, Gambling 
Goals: 
7 – Potts
1 – Barbary, Hughes, Kent, D. Lindner, Thomas, Trenorden, Whitford

1952 Premiership Side

North Adelaide 23.15 (153) defeated Norwood 6.9 (45)
Venue: Adelaide Oval
Attendance: 50,105
Date: 4 October 1952
Umpire: 

Best: 
Goals: 
4 – Kennett, McKenzie, Phillips
3 – Cox 
2 – Proud 
1 – Aldenhoven, Gilbourne, Griffin, Fuller, McKay, Renner

1949 Premiership Side

North Adelaide 13.17 (95) defeated West Torrens 9.18 (72)
Venue: Adelaide Oval
Attendance: 42,490
Date: 1 October 1949
Umpire: 

Best: 
Goals: 
4 – Stringer
3 – Cox 
2 – Peddler 
1 – Arbon, Kennett, Pash, Phillips

1931 Premiership Side

North Adelaide 17.13 (115) defeated Sturt 11.11 (77)
Venue: Adelaide Oval
Attendance: 34,202
Date: 3 October 1931
Umpire: 

Best: 
Goals: 
6 – Farmer
4 – Proud 
2 – Furler, Willshire 
1 – Burns, Hawke, Lock

1930 Premiership Side

North Adelaide 9.13 (67) defeated Port Adelaide 9.9 (63)
Venue: Adelaide Oval
Attendance: 23,609
Date: 4 October 1930
Umpire: 

Best: 
Goals: 
4 – Farmer
2 – Barrett 
1 – Burton, Furler, Hawke

1920 Premiership Side

North Adelaide 9.15 (69) defeated Norwood 3.3 (21)
Venue: Adelaide Oval
Attendance: Approximately 31,000
Date: 18 September 1920
Umpire: 

Best: 
Goals: 
2 – Frost, Leahy 
1 – Curnow, Lewis, Maloney, Sprigg, Trescowthick

1905 Premiership Side

North Adelaide 6.8 (44) defeated Port Adelaide 1.6 (12)
Venue: Adelaide Oval
Attendance: Approximately 11,000
Date: 9 September 1905
Umpire: 

Best: 
Goals: 
4 – Jessop 
1 – Fleet, Johns

1902 Premiership Side

North Adelaide 9.14 (68) defeated South Adelaide 4.7 (31)
Venue: Adelaide Oval
Attendance: not recorded
Date: 6 September 1902
Umpire: 

Best: 
Goals: 
4 – Jessop 
2 – Dickenson, Johns
1 – Daly

1900 Premiership Side

North Adelaide 4.3 (27) defeated South Adelaide 1.8 (14)
Venue: Adelaide Oval
Attendance: approximately 7,000
Date: 8 September 1900
Umpire: 

Best: 
Goals: 
2 – McNamara
1 – Matthews, Shaw

Team of the Century (1901–2000)
Selected by a committee composed of Colin Walsh (Chairman), Don Lindner, Tom McKenzie, Jeff Pash, Barrie Robran and Gordon Schwartz. Each member provided a list of candidates for each position and the Committee then set about the arduous task of selecting the final team. The selected team was formally announced at a gala dinner held on 7 October 2000.

Individual

Magarey Medallists

Phil Sandland 1901
Tom MacKenzie 1905, 1906
Tom Leahy 1913
Harold 'Dribbler' Hawke 1937
Jeff Pash 1939
H.Ron Phillips 1948, 1949
Ian McKay 1950
Barrie Barbary 1960
Don Lindner 1967^
Barrie Robran 1968, 1970, 1973
Tony Antrobus 1983
Andrew Jarman 1987
Brenton Phillips 1993
Josh Francou 1996
James Allan 2007, 2010, 2011
Rhys Archard 2009
Campbell Combe 2020
Aaron Young 2022
^ – awarded retrospectively

All-Australians
Haydn Bunton 1956
Don Lindner 1961
Andrew Jarman 1986, 1987

League Leading Goalkickers
Anthony "Bos" Daly (54) 1903, (30) 1905
Perc Lewis (58) 1923
Ken Farmer (105) 1930, (126) 1931, (102) 1932, (112) 1933, (106) 1934, (128) 1935, (134) 1936, (108) 1937, (112) 1938, (113) 1939, (123) 1940
W. McKenzie (67) 1954
Dennis Sachse (90) 1967
John Roberts (111) 1987
Daniel Hargraves (68) 2002

References

External links

 
 North Adelaide Football Club profile at australianfootball.com
 SANFL

South Australian National Football League clubs
SANFL Women's League
Australian rules football clubs in South Australia
1888 establishments in Australia
Australian rules football clubs established in 1888